Abraxas flavisinuata is a species of moth belonging to the family Geometridae. It was described by Warren in 1894. It is known from Japan.

The wingspan is 34–44 mm.

References

Abraxini
Moths of Japan
Moths described in 1894